Frederick James Cook (31 January 1870 – 30 November 1915) was a South African cricketer who played in one Test match in 1896.

Cook was a right-handed batsman who played for Eastern Province from the 1893–94 season to 1904–05. He made his highest score in his first-ever first-class cricket innings, when he captained Eastern Province and scored 59 and 28.

In 1895–96, he played in the first Test match between South Africa and the MCC side captained by Lord Hawke. Batting at number nine, he made 7 out of a total of 93 in the first innings and failed to score in the second innings, when South Africa were bowled out for 30, with George Lohmann taking eight wickets for seven runs. In this second innings, Cook was the first dismissal in a Lohmann hat-trick which finished the match.

At the outbreak of World War I he was commissioned in the Border Regiment and quickly promoted to captain. He went to Gallipoli, where he was attached to the 1/4th Battalion (Queen's Edinburgh Rifles) of the Royal Scots. He was killed in action on 30 November 1915.

See also
 List of Test cricketers born in non-Test playing nations

References

External links
 

1870 births
1915 deaths
British military personnel killed in World War I
South Africa Test cricketers
South African cricketers
Eastern Province cricketers
People from Java
British Army personnel of World War I
Border Regiment officers
Royal Scots officers